La Barr Meadows is a former settlement in Nevada County, California, located near Grass Valley. It was listed on an official map as of 1949.

References

Former settlements in Nevada County, California
Former populated places in California